Don Antonio González y González, 1st Marquess of Valdeterrazo (5 January 1792 in Valencia del Mombuey, Spain – 30 November 1876 in Madrid, Spain) was a Spanish politician, diplomat and lawyer who served two times as Prime Minister of Spain in the reign of Isabella II, and was also President of the Congress of Deputies.

External links

|-

|-

|-

Marquesses of Spain
Prime Ministers of Spain
Presidents of the Congress of Deputies (Spain)
1792 births
1876 deaths
Progressive Party (Spain) politicians
Ambassadors of Spain to the United Kingdom of Great Britain and Ireland